Hexen can refer to:

 N-Ethylhexedrone, a stimulant drug
 Hexen: Beyond Heretic, a 1995 dark fantasy video game by id Software and Raven Software
 Hexen II, a 1997 video game and sequel to the first Hexen.
 Hexen, a thrash metal band

See also
 Haxan (disambiguation)
 Hexene
 cis-3-Hexen-1-ol
 3,5,5-Trimethyl-2-cyclo-hexen-1-one
 (Z)-3-hexen-1-ol acetyltransferase
 Hexenal
 Hexenol